The NPD Group, Inc. (NPD; formerly National Purchase Diary Panel Inc. and NPD Research Inc.) is an American market research company founded on September 28, 1966, and based in Port Washington, New York. In 2017, NPD ranked as the 8th largest market research company in the world, according to the independent AMA Gold Report Top 50 report. The NPD Group operates in 20 countries, across more than 20 industries.

NPD measures how consumers shop across all channels, sourcing data from both retailers and consumers to quantify sales, share, distribution, and velocity. The market research company collects point-of-sale data, tracking retailers, distributors, and foodservice operators, measuring what's selling at 1,250 retailers, across 300,000 stores. NPD also interviews 12 million consumers annually and tracks millions of their receipts—following the same consumers over time—to understand shifting tastes and trends.

NPD helps retailers, manufacturers, financial analysts, and the public sector measure performance, predict future performance, improve marketing and product development, and identify business and consumer trends and market opportunities. NPD tracks spending and has dedicated advisers and analysts in more than 20 industries: apparel, appliances, automotive, beauty, books, consumer electronics, e-commerce, entertainment, fashion accessories, food consumption, foodservice, footwear, home, juvenile products, mobile, office supplies, retail, sports, technology, toys, travel retail, video games, and watches/jewelry.

In 1984, the company launched its first retail tracking service for toys and has launched similar services in other industries and product categories since then. In July 1999, the NPD Group and GfK co-purchased the entirety of market research firm Intelect ASW, a company focused according to The New York Times on "the consumer electronics, information technology and appliance industries." In early 2001, the NPD Group purchased PC Data's core business and merged its operations into NPD Intelect; 60 members of the PC Data staff migrated to the company. Intelect subsequently formed a subdivision dedicated to the console game market, NPDFunworld, in October 2001. NPDTechworld, a branch dedicated to the technology and software sector, followed in December. NPD uses sales data, such as checkout tracking from retailers and distributors as well as consumer-reported purchasing behavior, and offers consumer panel and retail sales tracking services, special reports, analytic solutions, and advisory services.

NPD began tracking the North American video game industry from 1995. In the 1990s, NPD's Toy Retail Survey Tracking (TRST) system was the video game industry's standard source for video game sales figures. The TRST collected these figures from 17 North American retail chains, or 63% of the American market. Those who purchased TRST's data, which NPD repackaged without extrapolation, were discouraged from republishing the raw figures.

NPD also provides a service called VIP Voice that allows consumers to complete surveys about the products and services that they use.

In October 2021, NPD entered intro an agreement to be acquired by private equity firm Hellman & Friedman.

NPD serves industries in the United States, Australia, Belgium, Brazil, Canada, China, France, Germany, Italy, Japan, Mexico, the Netherlands, New Zealand, Russia, South Korea, Spain, Sweden, Turkey, the United Kingdom.

BookScan, Pubtrack Digital, PubTrack Higher Education, PubTrack Christian, Books & Consumers, PubEasy and PubNet belong to NPD since January 2017. NPD has acquired these services from Nielsen's U.S. market information and research services for the book industry. In the U.S. these services are now part of NPD Book, a new U.S. practice area. Nielsen still operate their book services outside of the U.S., including BookScan in the UK, Ireland, Australia, New Zealand, India, South Africa, Italy, Spain, Brazil and Mexico.

References

External links 
 

Market research companies of the United States
Companies based in Nassau County, New York
Privately held companies based in New York (state)